Antisclerota is a monotypic moth genus in the family Xyloryctidae. Its only species, Antisclerota dicentris, is found in North Kivu in the Democratic Republic of the Congo. Both the genus and species were first described by Edward Meyrick in 1938.

References

Xyloryctidae
Monotypic moth genera
Taxa named by Edward Meyrick
Moths of Africa
Xyloryctidae genera